Lani Pallister (born 6 June 2002) is an Australian competitive swimmer. She is a world record holder in two sports, with a world record in swimming, the short course 4×200-metre freestyle relay, and world records in life saving for the youth age group in the 100-metre rescue medley and 200-metre super lifesaver. She holds the Oceanian, Commonwealth, and Australian records in the short course 1500-metre freestyle and the Australian record in the short course 800-metre freestyle. She is the first female World Short Course champion in the 1500-metre freestyle, winning the inaugural event for women at the 2022 edition. Over the course of the 2022 World Short Course Championships, she won the gold medal in each of the four events she contested (three individual events and one relay).

At the 2022 World Aquatics Championships, she became the first Australian woman to medal in the 1500-metre freestyle at a World Aquatics Championships, winning the bronze medal. She is a three-time, 2018, 2019, 2020, Pier to Pub open water swim winner.

Background
Pallister was born on 6 June 2002 in Sydney to mother Janelle Pallister, a swimmer at the 1988 Summer Olympics and gold medalist at the 1990 Commonwealth Games. She has been coached by her mother since a young age and in 2020 changed swimming clubs to Griffith University where she is coached by both Janelle Pallister and Michael Bohl. Her godmother is Olympian Dawn Fraser.

Career

2017–2018

2017 World Junior Championships
In August, 15-year-old Pallister competed at the 2017 FINA World Junior Swimming Championships, held in Indianapolis, United States, placing eighth in the 1500-metre freestyle with a 16:32.59 and tenth in the 800-metre freestyle with a 8:39.86. She followed up with a first open water title in the annual Pier to Pub swim in January 2018 at 15 years of age.

2018 National Pool Life Saving Championships
When Pallister was 16 years old, she set a new world life saving record in the 100-metre rescue medley of 1:12.14 at the 2018 National Pool Championships in Adelaide in August, lowering the previous record by over three tenths of a second.

2018 Junior Pan Pacific Championships
At the 2018 Junior Pan Pacific Swimming Championships in Suva, Fiji in August, Pallister won gold medals in the 1500-metre freestyle, 800-metre freestyle, 400-metre freestyle, as well as silver medals in the 4×200-metre freestyle relay and the 200-metre freestyle. Her time of 16:08.09 in the 1500-metre freestyle set a new Championships record in the event. She also won a silver medal in the 4×100-metre freestyle relay, which made her total medal count for the Championships six medals.

2018 World Lifesaving Championships
Returning to Adelaide following her success at the Junior Pan Pacific Championships, Pallister competed at the 2018 World Lifesaving Championships in November, helping team Australia win the world crown at the Championships. In the 200-metre super lifesaver event she set a new youth world life saving record in the event at 2:24.19. She also set a new world life saving record in the 100-metre rescue medley at 1:10.21, which was almost two seconds faster than the previous record she set in August.

2019–2020
In January 2019, Pallister won her second-consecutive title in the Pier to Pub open water swim in Lorne, winning the women's event, a 1.2-kilometre race, in a time of 12:20. Two months later, in March at the year's Surf Life Saving Australia Championships in Burleigh Heads, 16-year-old Pallister narrowly won the national title in the 2-kilometre ocean swim ahead of second-place finisher Kareena Lee.

2019 World Junior Championships

As a 17-year-old at the 2019 FINA World Junior Swimming Championships in Budapest, Hungary in August, Pallister won her first medal, a silver medal, in the 4×200-metre freestyle relay where she split a 1:58.61 for the lead-off leg of the relay, helping achieve a final time of 7:57.87. She won her first gold medal in the 800-metre freestyle, where she finished first with a Championships record time of 8:22.49. Pallister delivered her second gold medal in Championships record time in the 400-metre freestyle with a time of 4:05.42. On 24 August, Pallister won the 1500-metre freestyle with a time of 15:58.86, which marked her third gold medal at the Championships, set a new Championships record in the event, and was over 15 seconds faster than the next fastest swimmer in the event. Later in the same finals session, she won her second silver medal of the Championships, this time in the 4×100-metre freestyle relay where she swam a 55.23 for the third leg of the relay, contributing to the final time of 3:40.85. Pallister finished competing on 25 August, the final day of competition, winning a silver medal in the 200-metre freestyle with a time of 1:58.09 and making her efforts six-for-six in terms of medaling in every event she raced, winning a total of three gold medals and three silver medals.

After the end of competition, Pallister was named as one of two swimmers of the Championships, receiving the "Female Swimmer of the Championships" honour from FINA while Andrey Minakov of Russia was named as "Male Swimmer of the Championships". She was publicly announced as a nominee for the "One to Watch" award, one of the Australian Women's Health Sport Awards, in October 2019. The following month, Pallister was announced as the recipient of the "One to Watch" award.

2020 Queensland Championships
Pallister started off 2020 with a third-consecutive open water title in the Pier to Pub swim in January. In September, at the Queensland Short Course Championships, she set a new Australian record and a new Australian All Comers record in the 800-metre freestyle with a time of 8:11.71, which made her the first Australian woman to swim the race in less than 8 minutes and 12 seconds.

2020 Australian Short Course Championships
Due to the COVID-19 pandemic the 2020 Australian Short Course Championships were held virtually in November, Pallister took full advantage of the Championships still being held and set a new Australian record and a new Australian All Comers record in the 800-metre freestyle with her time of 8:10.12. She also set new Australian and Australian All Comers records in the 1500-metre freestyle with a time of 15:28.33 that made her the fourth fastest female swimmer in the race in history only behind Sarah Köhler of Germany, Mireia Belmonte of Spain, and Lauren Boyle of New Zealand.

2022
Leading up to the 2022 Commonwealth Games, Pallister and her mother both served as baton bearers as part of the 2022 Commonwealth Games Queen's Baton Relay in March. As of 30 March 2022, Pallister ranked second globally for the 2022 year in the long course 1500-metre freestyle, only behind Katie Ledecky of the United States.

2022 Australian Swimming Championships
At the 2022 Australian Swimming Championships in May, and conducted in long course metres, Pallister won the gold medal in the 800-metre freestyle with a personal best time of 8:17.77 and qualified for the 2022 World Aquatics Championships and 2022 Commonwealth Games. Her time made her the second-fastest female Australian ever in the long course 800-metre freestyle after Ariarne Titmus. On the third day, she swam a personal best time of 1:57.23 in the prelims heats of the 200-metre freestyle, qualifying for the final ranking fifth. In the final, she lowered her personal best time to a 1:56.28 and placed sixth. She achieved another World Championships and Commonwealth Games qualifying time in the 1500-metre freestyle on the fourth day, winning the gold medal with a personal best time of 15:55.40. The fifth and final day of competition, she ranked second in the prelims heats of the 400-metre freestyle with a time of 4:08.87 and qualified for the final. She placed second in the final with a personal best time of 4:02.21.

2022 World Aquatics Championships

On the first day of pool swimming competition at the 2022 World Aquatics Championships, Pallister qualified for the final of the 400-metre freestyle ranking third with a time of 4:03.71 in the preliminaries heats. In the evening final, she swam a personal best time of 4:02.16 and placed fourth. The following day, she ranked fourth in the preliminary stage of competition in the 1500-metre freestyle, qualifying for the final with a time of 15:57.61. She won the bronze medal in the final the following day, finishing in a personal best time of 15:48.96, which was less than five seconds behind silver medalist Katie Grimes of the United States. It marked the first time an Australian woman won a medal in the 1500-metre freestyle at a FINA World Aquatics Championships.

On day five, Pallister split a 1:56.86 for the second leg of the 4×200-metre freestyle relay in the preliminaries, helping qualify the relay for the final ranking first in 7:47.61. In the final, Leah Neale swam the second leg of the relay in her place and she won a silver medal for her efforts in the preliminaries when the finals relay finished second in 7:43.86. The next day, she qualified for the final of the 800 metre freestyle ranking second in the prelims, behind first-ranked Katie Ledecky of the United States and ahead of third-ranked Leah Smith of the United States, with a time of 8:24.66. She withdrew from competition following her finals qualification, not competing in the final of the event.

2022 Commonwealth Games
On day four of swimming competition at the 2022 Commonwealth Games, Pallister ranked first in the preliminaries of the 800-metre freestyle with a time of 8:32.67. In the final the following day, she lowered her time to a 8:19.16 and won the bronze medal behind two other Australian swimmers. In her final event of the Games, the 400-metre freestyle on the sixth and final day of swimming competition, she ranked fourth in the preliminaries, behind first-ranked Erika Fairweather of New Zealand, second-ranked Summer McIntosh of Canada, and third-ranked Ariarne Titmus of Pallister's country, and qualified for the final. In the final, she placed fifth with a time of 4:04.43, finishing 0.59 seconds behind fourth-place finisher Erika Fairweather and 5.30 seconds ahead of six-place finisher Eve Thomas, both of New Zealand. Following her performances, on 10 August, she was named to the Team Australia roster for the 2022 Duel in the Pool.

2022 Australian Short Course Championships
In August, at the 2022 Australian Short Course Swimming Championships, Pallister won the bronze medal in the 200-metre freestyle with a personal best time of 1:53.81 on day one before setting new Australian and Australia All Comers records in the 1500-meter freestyle with a time of 15:24.63 later in the day. Two days later, she won the 400-metre freestyle in a personal best time of 3:56.74. The fourth and final day, she won the 800-meter freestyle in a new Australian and Australian All Comers record time of 8:07.37.

2022 World Short Course Championships

Pallister earned a spot on the Team Australia roster for the 2022 World Short Course Championships in December based on her results at the 2022 Australian Short Course Championships and was publicly named to the roster on 2 September. The first morning, she advanced to the final of the 400-metre freestyle ranking second per her time of 3:59.50 in the preliminaries. For the final, she achieved a time drop of 1.70 seconds from her previous best time in the event, formerly 3:56.74, to win the gold medal with a new personal best time of 3:55.04. Her medal was the first gold medal won by a female Australian swimmer at the home-country 2022 World Short Course Championships.

The evening of day two, Pallister registered another personal best time, this time winning the gold medal in the 800-metre freestyle with an Australian and All Comers record time of 8:04.07, which was a 3.30 second improvement on her previous personal best and the corresponding national marks. She followed up with her first world record in swimming, helping win the gold medal in the 4×200-metre freestyle relay with the quickest split time of her finals relay teammates, a 1:52.24, that contributed to the new world record and Championships record mark of 7:30.87 and made her a simultaneous world record holder in two sports, one world record in swimming and two world records in life saving. For her final event of the Championships, the 1500-metre freestyle on day four, she won the first-ever World Short Course Championships title and gold medal in the event for a female swimmer, achieving her victory with a Championships, Oceanian, Commonwealth, Australian, and Australian All Comers record time of 15:21.43, which was a 3.20 second time drop from her previous best mark of 15:24.63. At the awards ceremony, she received her medal from her godmother Dawn Fraser.

International championships (50 m)

 Pallister swam only in the preliminary heats.

International championships (25 m)

Personal best times

Long course metres (50 m pool)

Short course metres (25 m pool)

World records

Short course metres (25 m pool)

World life saving records

Continental and national records

Short course metres (25 m pool)

Awards and honours
 Australian Women's Health Sport Awards, One to Watch: 2019
 FINA, Female Swimmer of the Championships: 2019 World Junior Championships
 Swimming Australia, Patron's Award: 2019
 SwimSwam Top 100 (Women's): 2021 (#63)

See also
 List of world records in life saving
 List of Australian records in swimming

References

External links
 

2002 births
Living people
Sportswomen from New South Wales
Australian lifesaving athletes
Australian female freestyle swimmers
Australian long-distance swimmers
World record setters in swimming
Sports world record holders
World Aquatics Championships medalists in swimming
Medalists at the FINA World Swimming Championships (25 m)
Swimmers at the 2022 Commonwealth Games
Commonwealth Games medallists in swimming
Commonwealth Games bronze medallists for Australia
Swimmers from Sydney
21st-century Australian women
Medallists at the 2022 Commonwealth Games